Graham McKee (born 1980) is an Irish international lawn & indoor bowler.

Bowls career
He has been capped by the combined Irish team. In 2018 he held a career high world indoor ranking of 20.

He has qualified for the World Indoor Bowls Championships in 2017, 2018 and 2019 and is twice a National champion after winning the pairs (2010) and fours (2015) at the Irish National Bowls Championships.

References

Living people
Male lawn bowls players from Northern Ireland
Irish male lawn bowls players
1980 births